The Namewaminikan River is a river in Thunder Bay District in northwestern Ontario, Canada. It is in the Great Lakes Basin and is a tributary of Lake Nipigon.

Course
It travels northeast through Georgia Lake, Barbara Lake, Parks Lake and Trapnarrows Lake to Gathering Lake, where it takes in the right tributaries Roslyn River and Margret Creek. It then heads north, passes into the municipality of Greenstone, and flows under Ontario Highway 11, forming at this point part of the Trans-Canada Highway, and reaches Turkey Lake, where it takes in the right tributary Wildgoose Creek. The river heads west, through Partridge Lake and over the Kinghorn Falls, Chute Falls and Twin Falls, takes in the left tributaries Foxear Creek and Corrigan Creek, heads through the Long Rapids, and reaches its mouth at Lake Nipigon. Lake Nipigon flows via the Nipigon River to Lake Superior.

Economy
Namewaminikan Hydro, a joint venture of three First Nations, the Animbiigoo Zaagi'igan Anishinaabek First Nation, the Biinjitiwaabik Zaaging Anishinaabek First Nation, and the Bingwi Neyaashi Anishinaabek First Nation, is developing two sites at Long Rapids and Twin Falls as run-of-the-river hydroelectric generating stations with a combined output of 10 MW. The project was to have been completed by December 2015.

Tributaries
Corrigan Creek (left)
Foxear Creek (left)
Lapierre Creek (right)
Legault Creek (left)
Wildgoose Creek (right)
South Beatty Creek (right)
Margret Creek (right)
Roslyn River (right)

References

Sources

Rivers of Thunder Bay District